Arthur Edward Ogus is an American mathematician. His research is in algebraic geometry; he has served as chair of the mathematics department at the University of California, Berkeley.

Ogus did his undergraduate studies at Reed College, graduating in 1968, and earned his doctorate in 1972 from Harvard University under the supervision of Robin Hartshorne. His doctoral students at Berkeley include Kai Behrend.

In September 2015, a conference in honor of his 70th birthday was held at the Institut des Hautes Études Scientifiques in France.

Selected publications
Books
.
.
.

Research papers
.
.
.
.

References

External links
Home page

Year of birth missing (living people)
Living people
Algebraic geometers
Reed College alumni
Harvard University alumni
20th-century American mathematicians
21st-century  American mathematicians
Place of birth missing (living people)
University of California, Berkeley faculty